Buglio in Monte is a comune (municipality) in the Province of Sondrio in the Italian region Lombardy, located about  northeast of Milan and about  west of Sondrio.

Buglio in Monte borders the following municipalities: Ardenno, Berbenno di Valtellina, Chiesa in Valmalenco, Colorina, Forcola, Torre di Santa Maria, Val Masino.

Demographic evolution

References

Cities and towns in Lombardy